is a former Japanese footballer who last played for Fujieda MYFC.

Club statistics
Updated to 23 February 2017.

References

External links
Profile at Fujieda MYFC

1988 births
Living people
Fuji Tokoha University alumni
Association football people from Shizuoka Prefecture
Japanese footballers
J3 League players
Japan Football League players
Fujieda MYFC players
Association football defenders